Catfish Creek is a creek in Elgin County in southwestern Ontario which empties into the north shore of Lake Erie.
Catfish Creek begins in the northwest area of Aylmer and flows in a generally southern direction before flowing into Lake Erie at Port Bruce.  It is a significant creek in that it flows through an area of Carolinian forest.  Worthy of note is the area just northwest of Port Bruce called the Catfish Creek Slope and Floodplain Forest. "Encompassing 233 hectares, this unique Area of Natural and Scientific Interest contains some of the most endangered habitat in Canada. It lies in the heart of the Carolinian Zone of Southern Ontario and provides mature, deciduous forest cover that is able to support plant and animal life normally found much further south. All of this Carolinian Canada site is privately owned."

Communities
Aylmer, Ontario
Port Bruce, Ontario

Gallery

See also  
List of rivers of Ontario

References

External links
Catfish Creek Conservation Authority

Rivers of Elgin County
Long Point Region Conservation Authority